Ash is the solid remains of fire.

Ash may also refer to:

Trees and shrubs 
 Fraxinus, the ash trees, a genus of flowering plants in the olive and lilac family
 Mountain ash, a name used for several trees, none of immediate relation
 Zanthoxylum (Prickly ash), genus of about 250 species of deciduous and evergreen trees and shrubs in the citrus or rue family, Rutaceae

Geography

England 
 Ash, now generally known as Salway Ash, in the parish of Netherbury, Dorset
 Ash (near Stourpaine), Dorset
 Ash (near Taunton), Somerset
 Ash, Braunton, a historic estate listed in the Domesday Book
 Ash, Derbyshire
 Ash, Devon
 Ash, Dover, Kent
 Ash, Musbury, a historic estate
 Ash, Oxfordshire
 Ash, Sevenoaks, Kent
 Ash, South Somerset
 Ash, Surrey

United States 
 Ash, Missouri, an unincorporated community
 Ash, North Carolina, Brunswick County
 Ash, Oregon, Douglas County
 Ash, Texas, an unincorporated community
 Ash, West Virginia, an unincorporated community
 Ash Mountain (Montana)

Canada 
 Ash Mountain (British Columbia)

People and fictional characters 
 Ash (name), a list of various people and fictional characters with the given name, nickname or surname
 Ash (artist) (born 1968), French graffiti artist

Books
 Ash (novel), a 2009 LGBTQ young adult novel by Malinda Lo
 Ash, novel by James Herbert
 Ash: A Secret History, a 2000 fantasy novel by Mary Gentle
 Ash (comics), a comic series about a superhero firefighter

Music
 Ash (band), a rock band from Northern Ireland
 Ash (ballet), by Peter Martins (1991)
 Ash (album), a 2017 album by French-Cuban R&B duo Ibeyi, also a track on the album

Other uses 
 Āsh, a Persian dish
 Ash (deity), the ancient Egyptian god of oases
 Ash (analytical chemistry)
 ash, traditional English name for Æ and æ, an Old English letter
 Ash (film), a 2019 drama about forest fires

Acronyms and codes
 AA-5 Ash, NATO name for the Soviet Bisnovat R-4 missile
 ash, ISO 693-3 code for the Tequiraca language
 Almquist shell, a command-line interface for computers
 a.s.h, Usenet newsgroup alt.suicide.holiday

See also 
 ASH (disambiguation)
 Oisc of Kent (or Æsc, pronounced “ash”; died 512), semi-legendary King of Kent
 Ash Wednesday, Christian religious holiday
 Ash Thursday, Icelandic volcanic events in 2010
 Ashe (disambiguation)
 Ashes (disambiguation)